Nicholas Anthony Ronald Waterlow  (30 August 1941 – 9 November 2009) was a curator at the Ivan Dougherty Gallery at UNSW in Sydney, Australia until his death. He was well known and respected as an expert on the history of art in Australia and was on the editorial board of the Art & Australia magazine. He was notable for his curating at the Biennale of Sydney at the Art Gallery of New South Wales and a retrospective of the pop artist Martin Sharp.

Waterlow was awarded the Medal of the Order of Australia (OAM) in the 1990 Australia Day Honours for "service to the arts".

See also
Visual arts of Australia

References

Nick Waterlow staff profile, College of Fine Arts, University of New South Wales 
Nick Waterlow's Obituary in Studio International 
McDonald, John. Curator was respected by all. Sydney Morning Herald, 11 November 2009. 
Coverage of murder

External links
 Nick Waterlow - Daily Telegraph obituary

1941 births
2009 deaths
Australian curators
Recipients of the Medal of the Order of Australia